Hornby-with-Farleton is a civil parish in the City of Lancaster in Lancashire, England. It had a population of 729 recorded in the 2001 census, increasing marginally to 730 at the 2011 census. The parish was formed 24 March 1887 from the parishes of "Hornby" and "Farleton".

Farleton
Farleton is located south of the main A683 road. The Toll House, a Grade II listed building was, in the 1920s, a garage.

See also
Listed buildings in Hornby-with-Farleton
Hornby Priory

References

External links

Hornby-with-Farleton Parish Council website
Hornby Village Institute
Lune Valley community swimming pool in Hornby
Hornby St Margaret's C of E Primary School
Hornby Castle website
Castle Stead
Lancaster City Council (Hornby falls under this council's remit)
Census data for Hornby with Farleton, 1841-1901

Civil parishes in Lancashire
Geography of the City of Lancaster
Forest of Bowland